University of Leuven or University of Louvain may refer to:
 Old University of Leuven (1425–1797)
 State University of Leuven (1817–1835)
 Catholic University of Leuven (1834–1968)
 Katholieke Universiteit Leuven or KU Leuven (1968–), a Dutch-speaking university in Leuven
 Université catholique de Louvain or UCLouvain (1968–), a French-speaking university in Louvain-la-Neuve, Brussels, Mons, Namur, Charleroi and Tournai

See also 
 Split of the Catholic University of Leuven
 Universities in Leuven
 Leuven University Press